Polling for the 17 September 2019 Israeli legislative election began on 26 May 2019.

Seat projections

Graphs 
These graphs show the polling trends from the time Knesset dissolved until the election day. No polls may be published from the end of Friday before the election until the polling stations closing on election day at 22:00.

If more than one poll was conducted on the same day, the graphs show the average of the polls for that date.

Polls 
Poll results are listed in the table below in reverse chronological order, showing the most recent first. The highest figure in each survey is displayed in bold and the background shaded in the leading party's colour. In the instance that there is a tie, then both figures are shaded. Parties that fall below the threshold are denoted by the percentage of votes that they received (N%), instead of the seats they would have gotten. When a poll has no information on a certain party, that party is instead marked by a dash (–).

Scenarios 
Zehut, Otzma Yehudit & Noam withdraw

Left-Wing Union (including Democratic Union) and URWP + New Right

Left-Wing Union (including Democratic Union)

Union of the Right-Wing Parties + New Right headed by Ayelet Shaked (including Democratic Union and Zehut)

Expanded Union of Right-Wing Parties headed by Ayelet Shaked (including Labor-Gesher)

Expanded Union of Right-Wing Parties headed by Ayelet Shaked

Expanded Union of Right-Wing Parties headed by Rafi Peretz (including Labor-Gesher)

Expanded Union of Right-Wing Parties headed by Rafi Peretz

Left-Wing Union

Likud+Ayelet Shaked, URWP+Naftali Bennett

Gabi Ashkenazi leading Blue & White

Zehut and New Right merger

Zehut and New Right merger and Left-Wing Union

Labor and Meretz merger without Gesher

Labor and IDP merger without Gesher, Expanded Union of Right-Wing Parties headed by Ayelet Shaked

Labor and IDP merger without Gesher, Expanded Union of Right-Wing Parties headed by Rafi Peretz

IDP and Meretz merger, New Right and URWP merger

URWP, New Right, and Otzma Yehudit merger

Democratic Union & URWP, New Right, and Otzma Yehudit merger

Democratic Union & URWP, New Right, Zehut, and Otzma Yehudit merger

Preferred Prime Minister polls 
Some opinion pollsters have asked voters which party leader they would prefer as Prime Minister. Their responses are given as percentages in the tables below.

Netanyahu vs Gantz

Netanyahu vs Barak

General

Potential bias 
Direct Polls institute, which conducts some of the polls, is owned by Shlomo Filber, the former director general of the Ministry of Communications and Likud campaign manager in the 2015 Israeli legislative election. Filber turned state's evidence in Case 4000, in which Prime Minister of Israel Benjamin Netanyahu has been indicted for bribery. In the April 2019 Israeli legislative election, Filber advised the New Right campaign, potentially compromising his objectivity. Filber's polling method is controversial and is based on SMS.

See also

April 2019 Israeli legislative election
2019 in Israel
List of elections in 2019

Notes

References

Opinion polling in Israel